Idiusia is a genus of moths of the family Crambidae. It contains only one species, Idiusia benepictalis, which is found in India (Khasia Hills).

References

Pyraustinae
Taxa named by William Warren (entomologist)
Crambidae genera
Monotypic moth genera